Vatav is a small village located in Petlad Taluka in Anand district, Gujarat, India. As of the 2011 Census of India, it had a population of 2,484. The pin code of Vatav is 388450. 

The village comes under Vatav panchayat. Vatav is administrated by a sarpanch (village head) who is an elected representative.

Demographics 

As of the 2011 Census of India, Vatav comprised 514 families, with 2,484 people total. 1307 are males while 1177 are females. The population density of the village is 927 persons per km2.

In Vatav village population of children with age 0-6 is 306 which makes up 12.32% of total population of village. Average Sex Ratio of Vatav village is 901 which is lower than Gujarat state average of 919. Child Sex Ratio for the Vatav as per census is 866, lower than Gujarat average of 890.

Vatav village has higher literacy rate compared to Gujarat. In 2011, literacy rate of Vatav village was 80.62% compared to 78.03% of Gujarat. In Vatav Male literacy stands at 90.90% while female literacy rate was 69.28%.

References

Villages in Anand district